Ashtanga yoga ("the eight limbs of yoga") is Patanjali's classification of classical yoga, as set out in his Yoga Sutras. He defined the eight limbs as yamas (abstinences), niyama (observances), asana (posture), pranayama (breathing), pratyahara (withdrawal), dharana (concentration), dhyana (meditation) and samadhi (absorption).

The eight limbs form a sequence from the outer to the inner. The posture, asana, must be steady and comfortable for a long time, in order for the yogi to practice the limbs from pranayama until samadhi. The main aim is kaivalya, discernment of Purusha, the witness-conscious, as separate from prakriti, the cognitive apparatus, and disentanglement of Purusha from its muddled defilements.

Definition of yoga 

Patanjali begins his treatise by stating the purpose of his book in the first sutra, followed by defining the word "yoga" in his second sutra of Book 1:

This terse definition hinges on the meaning of three Sanskrit terms. I. K. Taimni translates it as "Yoga is the inhibition of the modifications of the mind". Swami Vivekananda translates the sutra as "Yoga is restraining (nirodhah) the mind-stuff (citta) from taking various forms (vrittis)." When the mind is stilled, the seer or real Self is revealed:

Eight limbs

Patanjali set out his definition of yoga in the Yoga Sutras as having eight limbs (अष्टाङ्ग , "eight limbs") as follows:

The eightfold path of Patanjali's yoga consists of a set of prescriptions for a morally disciplined and purposeful life, of which asana (yoga posture) form only one limb.

1. Yamas

Yamas are ethical rules in Hinduism and can be thought of as moral imperatives (the "don'ts"). The five yamas listed by Patanjali in Yoga Sutra 2.30 are:

 Ahimsa (अहिंसा): Nonviolence, non-harming other living beings
 Satya (सत्य): truthfulness, non-falsehood
 Asteya (अस्तेय): non-stealing
 Brahmacharya (ब्रह्मचर्य): chastity, marital fidelity or sexual restraint
 Aparigraha (अपरिग्रह): non-avarice, non-possessiveness

Patanjali, in Book 2, states how and why each of the above self-restraints helps in an individual's personal growth. For example, in verse II.35, Patanjali states that the virtue of nonviolence and non-injury to others (Ahimsa) leads to the abandonment of enmity, a state that leads the yogi to the perfection of inner and outer amity with everyone, everything.

2. Niyamas

The second component of Patanjali's Yoga path is niyama, which includes virtuous habits and observances (the "dos"). Sadhana Pada Verse 32 lists the niyamas as:

 Shaucha (शौच): purity, clearness of mind, speech and body
 Santosha (संतोष): contentment, acceptance of others, acceptance of one's circumstances as they are in order to get past or change them, optimism for self
 Tapas (तपस्): persistence, perseverance, austerity, asceticism, self-discipline
 Svadhyaya (स्वाध्याय): study of Vedas, study of self, self-reflection, introspection of self's thoughts, speech and actions
 Ishvarapranidhana (ईश्वरप्रणिधान): contemplation of the Ishvara (God/Supreme Being, Brahman, True Self, Unchanging Reality)

As with the Yamas, Patanjali explains how and why each of the Niyamas helps in personal growth. For example, in verse II.42, Patanjali states that the virtue of contentment and acceptance of others as they are (Santosha) leads to the state where inner sources of joy matter most, and the craving for external sources of pleasure ceases.

3. Āsana

Patanjali begins discussion of Āsana (आसन, posture, seat) by defining it in verse 46 of Book 2, as follows,

Asana is a posture that one can hold for a period of time, staying relaxed, steady, comfortable and motionless. The Yoga Sutra does not list any specific asana. Āraṇya translates verse II.47 as, "asanas are perfected over time by relaxation of effort with meditation on the infinite"; this combination and practice stops the body from shaking. Any posture that causes pain or restlessness is not a yogic posture. Secondary texts that discuss Patanjali's sutra state that one requirement of correct posture for sitting meditation is to keep chest, neck and head erect (proper spinal posture).

The Bhasya commentary attached to the Sutras, now thought to be by Patanjali himself, suggests twelve seated meditation postures: Padmasana (lotus), Virasana (hero), Bhadrasana (glorious), Svastikasana (lucky mark), Dandasana (staff), Sopasrayasana (supported), Paryankasana (bedstead), Krauncha-nishadasana (seated heron), Hastanishadasana (seated elephant), Ushtranishadasana (seated camel), Samasansthanasana (evenly balanced) and Sthirasukhasana (any motionless posture that is in accordance with one's pleasure).

Over a thousand years later, the Hatha Yoga Pradipika mentions 84
 asanas taught by Shiva, stating four of these as most important: Siddhasana (accomplished), Padmasana (lotus), Simhasana (lion), and Bhadrasana (glorious), and describes the technique of these four and eleven other asanas. In modern yoga, asanas are prominent and numerous, unlike in any earlier form of yoga.

4. Prāņāyāma

After a desired posture has been achieved, verses II.49 through II.51 recommend prāṇāyāma, the practice of consciously regulating the breath (inhalation, the full pause, exhalation, and the empty pause). This is done in several ways, such as by inhaling and then suspending exhalation for a period, exhaling and then suspending inhalation for a period, by slowing the inhalation and exhalation, or by consciously changing the timing and length of the breath (deep, short breathing).

5. Pratyāhāra

Pratyahara is drawing within one's awareness. It is a process of retracting the sensory experience from external objects. It is a step of self extraction and abstraction. Pratyahara is not consciously closing one's eyes to the sensory world; it is consciously closing one's mind processes to the sensory world. Pratyahara empowers one to stop being controlled by the external world, fetch one's attention to seek self-knowledge and experience the freedom innate in one's inner world.

Pratyahara marks the transition of yoga experience from the first four limbs of Patanjali's Ashtanga scheme that perfect external forms, to the last three limbs that perfect the yogin's inner state: moving from outside to inside, from the outer sphere of the body to the inner sphere of the spirit.

6. Dhāraṇā

Dharana (Sanskrit: धारणा) means concentration, introspective focus and one-pointedness of mind. The root of the word is dhṛ (धृ), meaning "to hold, maintain, keep".

Dharana, as the sixth limb of yoga, is holding one's mind onto a particular inner state, subject or topic of one's mind. The mind is fixed on a mantra, or one's breath/navel/tip of tongue/any place, or an object one wants to observe, or a concept/idea in one's mind. Fixing the mind means one-pointed focus, without drifting of mind, and without jumping from one topic to another.

7. Dhyāna

Dhyana (Sanskrit: ध्यान) literally means "contemplation, reflection" and "profound, abstract meditation".

Dhyana is contemplating, reflecting on whatever Dharana has focused on. If in the sixth limb of yoga one focused on a personal deity, Dhyana is its contemplation. If the concentration was on one object, Dhyana is non-judgmental, non-presumptuous observation of that object. If the focus was on a concept/idea, Dhyana is contemplating that concept/idea in all its aspects, forms and consequences. Dhyana is uninterrupted train of thought, current of cognition, flow of awareness.

Dhyana is integrally related to Dharana, one leads to other. Dharana is a state of mind, Dhyana the process of mind. Dhyana is distinct from Dharana in that the meditator becomes actively engaged with its focus. Patanjali defines contemplation (Dhyana) as the mind process, where the mind is fixed on something, and then there is "a course of uniform modification of knowledge". Adi Shankara, in his commentary on Yoga Sutras, distinguishes Dhyana from Dharana, by explaining Dhyana as the yoga state when there is only the "stream of continuous thought about the object, uninterrupted by other thoughts of different kind for the same object"; Dharana, states Shankara, is focussed on one object, but aware of its many aspects and ideas about the same object. Shankara gives the example of a yogin in a state of dharana on morning sun may be aware of its brilliance, color and orbit; the yogin in dhyana state contemplates on sun's orbit alone for example, without being interrupted by its color, brilliance or other related ideas.

8. Samādhi

Samadhi (Sanskrit: समाधि) literally means "putting together, joining, combining with, union, harmonious whole, trance". In samadhi, when meditating on an object, only the object of awareness is present, and the awareness that one is meditating disappears. Samadhi is of two kinds, Samprajnata Samadhi, with support of an object of meditation, and Asamprajnata Samadhi, without support of an object of meditation. 

Samprajnata Samadhi, also called savikalpa samadhi and Sabija Samadhi, meditation with support of an object, is associated with deliberation, reflection, bliss, and I-am-ness (YS 1.17).

The first two associations, deliberation and reflection, form the basis of the various types of Samāpatti:
 Savitarka, "deliberative" (YS 1.42): The citta is concentrated upon a gross object of meditation, an object with a manifest appearance that is perceptible to our senses, such as a flame of a lamp, the tip of the nose, or the image of a deity. Conceptualization (vikalpa) still takes place, in the form of perception, the word and the knowledge of the object of meditation. When the deliberation is ended this is called nirvitarka samadhi (YS 1.43).
 Savichara, "reflective": the citta is concentrated upon a subtle object of meditation, which is not perceptible to the senses, but arrived at through inference, such as the senses, the process of cognition, the mind, the I-am-ness, the chakras, the inner-breath (prana), the nadis, the intellect (buddhi). The stilling of reflection is called nirvichara samapatti (YS 1.44).

The last two associations, sananda samadhi and sasmita, are respectively a state of meditation, and an object of savichara samadhi:
 Sananda Samadhi, ananda, "bliss": this state emphasizes the still subtler state of bliss in meditation;
 Sasmita: the citta is concentrated upon the sense or feeling of "I-am-ness".

According to Ian Whicher, the status of ananda and asmita in Patanjali's system is a matter of dispute. According to Maehle, the first two constituents, deliberation and reflection, form the basis of the various types of samapatti. According to Feuerstein,

Ian Whicher disagrees with Feuerstein, seeing ananda and asmita as later stages of nirvicara-samapatti. Whicher refers to Vācaspati Miśra (AD 900-980), the founder of the Bhāmatī Advaita Vedanta who proposes eight types of samapatti:
 Savitarka-samāpatti and Nirvitarka-samāpatti, both with gross objects as objects of support;
 Savicāra-samāpatti and Nirvicāra-samāpatti, both with subtle objects as objects of support;
 Sānanda-samāpatti and Nirānanda-samāpatti, both with the sense organs as objects of support
 Sāsmitā-samāpatti and Nirasmitā-samāpatti, both with the sense of "I-am-ness" as support.

Vijnana Bikshu (ca. 1550-1600) proposes a six-stage model, explicitly rejecting Vacaspati Misra's model. Vijnana Bikshu regards joy (ananda) as a state that arises when the mind passes beyond the vicara stage. Whicher agrees that ananda is not a separate stage of samadhi. According to Whicher, Patanjali's own view seems to be that nirvicara-samadhi is the highest form of cognitive ecstasy.

Asamprajnata Samadhi, also called Nirvikalpa Samadhi and Nirbija Samadhi, is meditation without an object, which leads to knowledge of purusha or consciousness, the subtlest element.

Soteriological goal: Kaivalya 

According to Bryant, the purpose of yoga is liberation from suffering, caused by entanglement with the world, by means of discriminative discernment between Purusha, the witness-consciousness, and prakriti, the cognitive apparatus including the muddled mind and the kleshas. The eight limbs are "the means of achieving discriminative discernment," the "uncoupling of puruṣa from all connection with prakṛti and all involvement with the citta." Bryant states that, to Patanjali, Yoga-practice "essentially consists of meditative practices culminating in attaining a state of consciousness free from all modes of active or discursive thought, and of eventually attaining a state where consciousness is unaware of any object external to itself, that is, is only aware of its own nature as consciousness unmixed with any other object." 

The Samkhya school suggests that jnana (knowledge) is a sufficient means to moksha, Patanjali suggests that systematic techniques/practice (personal experimentation) combined with Samkhya's approach to knowledge is the path to moksha. Patanjali holds that avidya, ignorance is the cause of all five kleshas, which are the cause of suffering and saṁsāra. Liberation, like many other schools, is removal of ignorance, which is achieved through discriminating discernment, knowledge and self-awareness. The Yoga Sūtras is the Yoga school's treatise on how to accomplish this. Samādhi is the state where ecstatic awareness develops, state Yoga scholars, and this is how one starts the process of becoming aware of Purusa and true Self. It further claims that this awareness is eternal, and once this awareness is achieved, a person cannot ever cease being aware; this is moksha, the soteriological goal in Hinduism.

Book 3 of Patanjali's Yogasutra is dedicated to soteriological aspects of yoga philosophy. Patanjali begins by stating that all limbs of yoga are a necessary foundation to reaching the state of self-awareness, freedom and liberation. He refers to the three last limbs of yoga as samyama, in verses III.4 to III.5, and calls it the technology for "discerning principle" and mastery of citta and self-knowledge. In verse III.12, the Yogasutras state that this discerning principle then empowers one to perfect sant (tranquility) and udita (reason) in one's mind and spirit, through intentness. This leads to one's ability to discern the difference between sabda (word), artha (meaning) and pratyaya (understanding), and this ability empowers one to compassionately comprehend the cry/speech of all living beings. Once a yogi reaches this state of samyama, it leads to unusual powers, intuition, self-knowledge, freedoms and kaivalya, the redemptive goal of the yogi.

See also

 Seven stages (Yogi) — the seven stages of progress in the Vyasa commentary on the Yoga Sutras
 Noble Eightfold Path 
 Dhyana in Buddhism

Notes

References

Sources

Further reading 

 TR Tatya (1885), The Yoga Philosophy, with Bhojaraja commentary; Harvard University Archives;
 GN Jha (1907), The Yoga-darsana: The sutras of Patanjali with the Bhasya of Vyasa with notes; Harvard University Archives;
 Charles Johnston (1912), The Yogasutras of Patanjali 
 I.K. Taimni (1961), The Science of Yoga: The Yoga Sutras of Patanjali
 Chip Hartranft (2003), The Yoga-Sûtra of Patañjali. Sanskrit-English Translation & Glossary (86 pages)

Hindu texts
Sutra literature
Ancient yoga texts